Boris Kozlov (born 18 November 1950) is a Soviet diver. He competed in the men's 3 metre springboard event at the 1976 Summer Olympics.

References

1950 births
Living people
Soviet male divers
Olympic divers of the Soviet Union
Divers at the 1976 Summer Olympics
Place of birth missing (living people)